Indupalli railway station (station code:IDP) is located in the village of Indupalli and serves Indupalli and Chikinala It lies on the Vijayawada–Nidadavolu loop line and is administered under Vijayawada railway division of South Coast Railway zone.

References 

Railway stations in Andhra Pradesh
Railway stations in Krishna district
Railway stations in Vijayawada railway division